Chile–Cuba relations refers to interstate relations between the Republic of Chile and the Republic of Cuba. Cuba has been, since the 1960s, a reference point to left wing politicians in Chile.

History
Chile, together with Argentina, Brazil, Mexico, Bolivia and Ecuador, was opposed to sanctions imposed on Cuba by the United States during the 1962 OAS meeting in Punta del Este, Uruguay.

In 1971 Chile re-established diplomatic relations with Cuba, joining Mexico and Canada in rejecting  a previously-established Organization of American States convention prohibiting governments in the Western Hemisphere from establishing diplomatic relations with Cuba. Shortly afterward, Cuban premier Fidel Castro made a month-long visit to Chile. With Salvador Allende he visited the recently nationalized El Teniente copper mine.

During Pinochet's military dictatorship in Chile (1973–1990) Cuba provided training and arms for Chilean leftists to set up an armed resistance. Chilean Revolutionary Left Movement drew inspiration from the Cuban Revolution and the Sierra Maestra in trying to set up a guerrilla in Neltume, which was obliterated in 1981. After that the Cuban-inspired rural warfare proved to be a failure, Cuba continued to support urban guerrillas such as FPMR. One of the largest smuggling of Cuban arms occurred in Carrizal Bajo, these arms where later used by FPMR to perform an assassination attempt against Pinochet in 1986.

In 2009 Bachelet visited Cuba, making her the first Chilean leader to visit the island nation since Salvador Allende's 1972 trip.

Chilean ambassadors to Cuba
Jorge Manuel Toha (2006)

See also
Foreign relations of Chile
Foreign relations of Cuba
Fidel Castro's state visit to Chile

References

 
Cuba
Chile